Vassalboro Community School (VCS) is a school district in Vassalboro, Maine, as well as its single grade school.

Vassalboro was a part of Kennebec Valley Consolidated Schools (AOS92) until July 1, 2018.

References

External links
 Vassalboro Community School
School districts in Maine
Education in Kennebec County, Maine
School districts established in 2018